Tijana Malešević (born 18 March 1991) is a Serbian volleyball player, who plays for OK Crvena zvezda, and was a member of the Serbia women's national volleyball team that won the gold medal at the 2011 European Championship in Serbia and Italy and 2017 Women's European Volleyball Championship in Azerbaijan and Georgia, and gold medal at the 2018 FIVB Volleyball Women's World Championship held in Japan.

She signed with the Turkish club Sarıyer Belediyespor for the 2014–15 season. On 18 December 2018 Tijana signed with Serbian powerhouse OK Crvena zvezda. On 25 January 2019 Tijana signed contract for second part of the 2018-19 season with Serie A1 member, Il Bisonte Firenze. At the start of the 2019/20 season, Tijana returned to Belgrade and OK Crvena zvezda.
She is the sister of Serbian basketball player Nikola Malešević.

Awards

Clubs
 2016/17 Brazilian Superliga -  Runner up, with Vôlei Nestlé
 2017/18 CEV Champions League -  Runner-Up, with CSM Volei Alba Blaj

References

External links
World of volley, interview with Tijana Malešević
Tijana Malešević - French

1991 births
Living people
Sportspeople from Užice
Serbian women's volleyball players
Sarıyer Belediyesi volleyballers
Volleyball players at the 2015 European Games
European Games medalists in volleyball
European Games bronze medalists for Serbia
Volleyball players at the 2016 Summer Olympics
Olympic volleyball players of Serbia
Olympic silver medalists for Serbia
Medalists at the 2016 Summer Olympics
Olympic medalists in volleyball
European champions for Serbia
Expatriate volleyball players in the Czech Republic
Expatriate volleyball players in Italy
Expatriate volleyball players in Poland
Expatriate volleyball players in Switzerland
Expatriate volleyball players in Turkey
Expatriate volleyball players in Brazil
Expatriate volleyball players in Romania
Serbian expatriate sportspeople in Brazil
Serbian expatriate sportspeople in the Czech Republic
Serbian expatriate sportspeople in Italy
Serbian expatriate sportspeople in Poland
Serbian expatriate sportspeople in Switzerland
Serbian expatriate sportspeople in Turkey
Serbian expatriate sportspeople in Romania